I piaceri dello scapolo is a 1960 Italian film directed by Giulio Petroni and starring Sylva Koscina and Mario Carotenuto.

Plot
Two bachelors who are no longer young rent a garçonnière. Their enthusiasm lasts very little, however, as all their attempts to use it to bring dates there appear to be useless.

Cast
 Sylva Koscina as Eby
 Mario Carotenuto as Mario
 Memmo Carotenuto as Memmo
 Gina Rovere as Franca
 Andrea Checchi as Eng. Rocchetti
 Marisa Merlini as Evelina
 Nanda Primavera as Evelina's mother
 Mario Passante as the friar
 Carlo Pisacane as the doorman
 Graziella Granata as Gianna

Censorship 
When I piaceri dello scapolo was first released in Italy in 1960 the Committee for the Theatrical Review of the Italian Ministry of Cultural Heritage and Activities rated it as VM16: not suitable for children under 16. In addition the committee imposed the following revisions: 1) the sequences in which the prostitute Franca appears half-dressed will be shortened as much as possible without disrupting the plot; 2) the scenes in which she takes on alluring poses and behaviors typical of her trade will be definitely deleted; 3) the scenes in which the priest is begging and in which the priest is speaking to Memmo (the latter to be shortened as much as possible) will be deleted. The first two scenes mentioned are considered immoral and offensive to decency, the other ones are considered offensive to religion. The official document number is: 30635, it was signed on 22 February 1960 by Minister Domenico Magrì.

References

External links
 

1960 films
Films directed by Giulio Petroni
Italian comedy films
1960 comedy films
Lux Film films
1960s Italian-language films
1960s Italian films